The Nokia Actionman is a mobile phone from Nokia which has been discontinued. It was launched in January 1984 and used the NMT 450 network. It has a monochromic LCD display. The phone is meant to be kept in cars. It only supports calling features. Multimedia and messaging are not supported by the Actionman. It has 100 channels which can be changed via the numeric keypad.

External links
Nokia Actionman (Nokia museum)

Actionman